The Fight Never Ends is an American film with a crime fighting theme released in 1948. It was directed by Joe Lerner,
with a cast that included boxer Joe Louis, Ruby Dee, The Mills Brothers, and Harrel Tillman. It was one of stage star Ruby Dee's first films.

A poster for the film tauted it with the slogan "The Brown Bomber Fights His Greatest Fight - Against Crime".

Cast
Joe Louis as "The Champ"
Ruby Dee as Janey
The Mills Brothers
Harrel Tillman as Jerry, also known as "The Caper"
Gwendolyn Tynes
Elwood Smith as Howard "Howie" Robinson
William Greaves as Frankie
Emmett "Babe" Wallace
Milton Woods
Gilbert Whyte as Spider
William Leftwich as Cricket
Roger Furman

References

Joe Louis
1948 films
American crime films
1940s American films